The Alcan Golfer of the Year Championship, also known as the Alcan Open, was an international golf tournament played from 1967 to 1970. It was sponsored by Alcan Aluminum of Canada, a long-time corporate sponsor of professional golf on international circuits. A concurrent Alcan International tournament was also played. The 1969 tournament, played in the United States, was an official PGA Tour event.

Tournament hosts
1967 Old Course at St Andrews, St Andrews, Scotland
1968 Royal Birkdale Golf Club, Southport, England
1969 Portland Golf Club, Portland, Oregon, United States
1970 Portmarnock Golf Club, Portmarnock, Ireland

Winners

Alcan Open

Alcan International

Notes

References

Former PGA Tour events
Golf in Oregon
Sports in Portland, Oregon
Recurring sporting events established in 1967
Recurring sporting events disestablished in 1970